Obornjača may refer to:

 Obornjača (Ada), a village in the Ada municipality, Serbia
 Obornjača (Bačka Topola), a village in the Bačka Topola municipality, Serbia